Sawyer is a given name of English origin. It is the given name of:

Sawyer Fredericks (born 1999), American singer–songwriter
Sawyer Sweeten (1995–2015), American child actor
Sawyer Fulton (born 1990), professional wrestler

Fictional characters
Sawyer, an alternate alias of Port Monmouth resident Daniel Murray, created in collaboration with Tim Pannella. 
Sawyer, fictional character played by Josh Holloway on the ABC television series Lost
Sawyer, recurring character and rival of Ash Ketchum in the anime series Pokémon: XY 
Sawyer, a fictional zombie on the Canadian animated series Camp Lakebottom
Sawyer, a female white cat in Cats Don't Dance

English-language masculine given names
English masculine given names